Abdel Aziz Boulehia (born 3 August 1970) is an Algerian boxer. He competed in the men's bantamweight event at the 1996 Summer Olympics.

References

External links
 

1970 births
Living people
Algerian male boxers
Olympic boxers of Algeria
Boxers at the 1996 Summer Olympics
Place of birth missing (living people)
Bantamweight boxers
21st-century Algerian people
20th-century Algerian people